Binnein an Fhidhleir, one of the Arrochar Alps, is a mountain in southern Scotland. It is located above Butterbridge on the north side the A83 road facing Beinn an Lochain to the south. The mountain has several tops, including Creag Bhrosgan (711 m); Stob Coire Creagach, which replaced Binnein an Fhidhleir as the Marilyn in April 2006  at 817 m; one without any name at all at 748 metre; and Binnein an Fhidhleir itself, further to the west, at 811 m. Although Stob Coire Creagach is the highest summit, the name Binnein an Fhidhleir is generally used for the whole mountain.

The shortest route of ascent is directly up the hillside above Butterbridge, where there is a carpark. A number of small crags must be avoided, and the route is steep and unrelenting. Alternatively, the hill may be ascended from further up Glen Kinglas by way of Binnein an Fhidhleir's northern ridge: although longer this route is considerably less steep.

References

Marilyns of Scotland
Corbetts
Mountains and hills of the Southern Highlands
Mountains and hills of Argyll and Bute